"Wish You Were Here" is a song written by Bill Anderson, Skip Ewing, and Debbie Moore, and recorded by American country music artist Mark Wills.  The song reached the top of the Billboard Hot Country Singles & Tracks (now Hot Country Songs) chart.  It was released in January 1999 as the third single and title track from his album of the same name.  The song was also Wills's first Billboard number-one single.

Background
Wills told Billboard magazine that it while some people say it is a sad song, "it's really a very positive, optimistic love song about life after death."

Chart positions
"Wish You Were Here" debuted at number 54 on the U.S. Billboard Hot Country Singles & Tracks for the week of January 23, 1999.

Year-end charts

References

1999 singles
1998 songs
Mark Wills songs
Songs written by Bill Anderson (singer)
Songs written by Skip Ewing
Song recordings produced by Carson Chamberlain
Mercury Records singles